Bipectilus is a genus of moths of the family Hepialidae. There are eight described species in the genus, distributed through China, Nepal and Vietnam.

Species
Bipectilus gracilirami
Bipectilus latirami
Bipectilus omaiensis
Bipectilus paraunimacula
Bipectilus perfuscus
Bipectilus tindalei
Bipectilus unimacula
Bipectilus yunnanensis
Bipectilus zhejiangensis

External links
Hepialidae genera

Hepialidae
Exoporia genera